The 1964 Washington Senators season involved the Senators finishing 9th in the American League with a record of 62 wins and 100 losses.

Offseason 
 October 14, 1963: Minnie Miñoso was released by the Senators.
 November 30, 1963: Marshall Bridges was purchased by the Senators from the New York Yankees.
 December 2, 1963: Howie Koplitz was drafted by the Senators from the Detroit Tigers in the 1963 rule 5 draft.
 December 6, 1963: Bill Skowron was purchased by the Senators from the Los Angeles Dodgers.
 December 6, 1963: Hobie Landrith was released by the Senators.
 March 31, 1964: The Senators traded a player to be named later to the Baltimore Orioles for Buster Narum. The Senators completed the deal by sending Lou Piniella to Orioles on August 4.

Regular season

Season standings

Record vs. opponents

Notable transactions 
 July 13, 1964: Bill Skowron and Carl Bouldin were traded by the Senators to the Chicago White Sox for Joe Cunningham and a player to be named later. The White Sox completed the deal by sending Frank Kreutzer to the Senators on July 28.

Roster

Player stats

Batting

Starters by position 
Note: Pos = Position; G = Games played; AB = At bats; H = Hits; Avg. = Batting average; HR = Home runs; RBI = Runs batted in

Other batters 
Note: G = Games played; AB = At bats; H = Hits; Avg. = Batting average; HR = Home runs; RBI = Runs batted in

Pitching

Starting pitchers 
Note: G = Games pitched; IP = Innings pitched; W = Wins; L = Losses; ERA = Earned run average; SO = Strikeouts

Other pitchers 
Note: G = Games pitched; IP = Innings pitched; W = Wins; L = Losses; ERA = Earned run average; SO = Strikeouts

Relief pitchers 
Note: G = Games pitched; W = Wins; L = Losses; SV = Saves; ERA = Earned run average; SO = Strikeouts

Farm system 

Toronto affiliation shared with Milwaukee Braves

References

External links
1964 Washington Senators team page at Baseball Reference
1964 Washington Senators team page at www.baseball-almanac.com

Texas Rangers seasons
Washington Senators season
Washing